Public Stenographer is a 1933 American Pre-Code romantic comedy. Stenographer Ann McNair (Lane) en route to a job mistakenly gets in the wrong car and ends up at a wild party thrown by Jim Martin (Collier). While in pursuit of McNair, Martin is also engaged to a society heiress.

Cast
Buster Collier, Jr. – Jim Martin
Lola Lane – Ann McNair
Jason Robards, Sr. – Fred White
Duncan Renaldo – Jerome Eagan

References

External links
 
 
 
 

1933 films
1930s English-language films
1933 romantic comedy films
American black-and-white films
American romantic comedy films
Films directed by Lewis D. Collins
1930s American films